Sharyn may refer to:

Sharyn (given name)
Sharyn National Park in Kazakhstan
Sharyn Canyon in Kazakhstan
Sharyn River in Kazakhstan